Štajngrova (in older sources also Stangrov) is a settlement in the Slovene Hills in the Municipality of Benedikt in northeastern Slovenia. The area is part of the traditional region of Styria. It is now included in the Drava Statistical Region.

References

External links
Štajngrova at Geopedia

Populated places in the Municipality of Benedikt